An Opalski cell is a large (up to 35 μm in diameter) altered glial cell, originated from degenerating astrocytes, with small, eccentric, pyknotic, densely staining nuclei (single or multiple) displaced to the periphery, and fine granular cytoplasm, found in the cortical and subcortical regions (basal ganglia and thalamus) of the brains of people with Wilson disease and acquired hepatolenticular degeneration. Opalski cells was described by Adam Opalski, Polish neurologist and neuropathologist.

References

Neuropathology